Joyce Krawiec (born June 14, 1945) is an American politician who has served in the North Carolina Senate from the 31st district since 2014.

Electoral history

2020

2018

2016

2014

References

|-

1945 births
Living people
Republican Party members of the North Carolina House of Representatives
Republican Party North Carolina state senators
Women state legislators in North Carolina
21st-century American politicians
21st-century American women politicians
People from Cheraw, South Carolina